Təzəkənd (also, Tazakend) is a village and municipality in the Shamkir Rayon of Azerbaijan.  It has a population of 4,699.  The municipality consists of the villages of Təzəkənd and Düzqışlaq.

References 

Populated places in Shamkir District